The following is the discography of American singer Slim Whitman.

Studio albums

 [A] Slim Whitman Sings and Yodels compiles recordings made by Whitman for RCA Victor in the late 1940s – 1950 and was released after the singer made it big on Imperial. But since it was common practice at the time to compile albums from recordings already available as 78-r.p.m. and 45-r.p.m. sides, the album is listed here as a regular one and not as a compilation.Colin Larkin's Encyclopedia of Popular Music, too, lists it as a regular album, along with America's Favorite Folk Singer that was released in the same year by Imperial and compiled songs recorded for the Imperial label.
 [B] Red River Valley also peaked at no. 18 in New Zealand and at no. 81 on the retrospective Kent Music Report chart in Australia.
 [C] Songs I Love to Sing also peaked at no. 24 on the RPM Country Albums chart in Canada.

Live albums

Compilation albums

Singles (U.S.) 

This is a list of U.S. singles. In the UK, Whitman's recordings were released on London Records, and the songs were often coupled differently.

For songs released before 1958, the "album" column simply indicates the first album appearance. It doesn't have to be (and often isn't) the same version. There is also a 1962 album titled Forever, for which Whitman recorded new versions of some more of his early hits ("Danny Boy", "North Wind", "I'm a Fool", and  "Smoke Signals").

After Whitman hit it big on Imperial, RCA Victor hastily issued several singles with his old recordings for the label to cash off of his popularity. The 1953 RCA Victor single "I'm Casting My Lasso Towards the Sky" was even coupled with the same song as the then-latest Whitman's single for Imperial.

 [A] "Reminiscing" peaked at No. 4 on the RPM Adult Contemporary Tracks chart in Canada.
 [B] "Indian Love Call" and "China Doll" charted in the UK upon the single's reissue(s) in 1955 (cat. no. London HL 1149, 1955 reussue).
 [C] In the UK, "Serenade" was released as a single on its own right, coupled with "I Talk to the Waves" (London HL 8287)

Singles (UK) 

This is a list of singles released in the UK on the London label.
 "Indian Love Call" / "China Doll" (HL 1149, November 1952) 
 "Love Song of the Waterfall" / "How Can I Tell?" (L 1186)
 "Bandera Waltz" / "My Love Is Growing Stale" (L 1191)
 "Song of the Old Waterwheel" / "Restless Heart" (L 1194)
 "My Heart Is Broken in Three" / "Cold, Empty Arms" (L 1206)
 "Danny Boy" / "There's a Rainbow in Every Teadrop" (L 1214)
 "North Wind" / "Darlin' Don't Cry" (L 1226)
 "Stairway to Heaven" / "Lord, Help Me Be as Thou" (HL 8018)
 "Secret Love" / "Why?" (HL 8039)
 "Rose Marie" / "We Stood at the Altar" (HL 8061)
 "Beautiful Dreamer" / "Ride Away" (HL 8080)
 "The Singing Hills" / "I Hate to See You Cry" (HL 8091)
 "Cattle Call" / "When I Grow Too Old to Dream" (HL 8125)
 "Roll On, Silvery Moon" / "Haunter Hungry Heart" (HL 8141)
 "I'll Never Stop Loving You" / "I'll Never Take You Back Again" (HL 8167)
 "Song of the Wild" / "You Have My Heart" (HL 8196)
 "Tumbling Tumbleweeds" / "Tell Me" (HL 8230)
 "I'm a Fool" / "My Heart Is Broken in Three" (HL 8252)
 "Serenade" / "I Talk to the Waves" (HL 8287)
 "The Whiffenpoof Song" / "Dear Mary" (HL 8327)
 "I'm Casting My Lasso Towards the Sky" / "There's a Love Knot in My Lariat" (HL 8350)
 "I'll Take You Home Again, Kathleen" / "Careless Love" (HL 8403)
 "Curtain of Tears" / "Smoke Signals" (HL 8416)
 "An Amateur in Love" / "(Since You've) Gone" (HL 8420)
 "Warm, Warm Lips" / "Many Times" (HL 8434)
 "Lovesick Blues" / "Forever" (HL 8459)
 "Unchain My Heart" / "Hush-a-bye" (HL 8518)
 "A Very Precious Love" / "Careless Hands" (HL 8590)
 "Candy Kisses" / "Tormented" (HL 8642)
 "At the End of Nowhere" / "Wherever You Are" (HL 8708)
...

References 

Whitman, Slim
Country music discographies